The 1990 RTHK Top 10 Gold Songs Awards was held in 1990 for the 1989 music season.

Top 10 song awards
The top 10 songs (十大中文金曲) of 1990 are as follows.

Other awards

References
 RTHK top 10 gold song awards 1990

RTHK Top 10 Gold Songs Awards
Rthk Top 10 Gold Songs Awards, 1990
Rthk Top 10 Gold Songs Awards, 1990